Adriano Fedele (born 13 October 1947) is an Italian professional football coach and a former player.

Honours
 Coppa Italia winner: 1977/78.

External links

1947 births
Living people
Italian footballers
Serie A players
Serie B players
Serie C players
Udinese Calcio players
Bologna F.C. 1909 players
Inter Milan players
Hellas Verona F.C. players
Italian football managers
Novara F.C. managers
Udinese Calcio managers
Calcio Padova managers
Modena F.C. managers
Association football defenders
A.S. Pro Gorizia players